Nikolaos Savvidis (born 20 July 1992) is a Greek former professional footballer who played as a defender.

Club career
Savvidis started is professional career with Ethnikos Katerini. In 2010, he was transferred to his hometown's club Panserraikos failing to make any appearances in the 2010-2011 season. In 2011, he was transferred to Pontioi Katerinis. After the club's merger with Iraklis Savidis was entered in the merged club's squad and he made his debut for Iraklis in an away draw against Doxa Kranoulas.

References

External links 
 Player profile in Iraklis' Official site

Living people
1992 births
Greek footballers
Iraklis Thessaloniki F.C. players
Panserraikos F.C. players
Association football central defenders
Footballers from Serres